Godoy Cruz is a  central department of Mendoza Province in Argentina.

Its borders are Mendoza Department in the north, Guaymallén in the northeast, Maipú in the southeast, Luján de Cuyo in the south and Las Heras in the southwest and to the west.

The department and its cabecera (head town) are named in honour of Argentine statesman and businessman Tomás Godoy Cruz (1791-1852).

Economy

Despite its relatively tiny size (0.1% of Mendoza Province), Godoy Cruz is home to 182,977 inhabitants (11.6%), and accounts for around 36% of Mendoza's economy.

The main activity of the department is the commerce (specially auto sales companies) and the services sector. There are some wineries but there aren't vineyards. The Casino of Mendoza is in the border of Godoy Cruz and Mendoza City.

Population

Considering its urban population (99.97%), it's the most densely populated department of Mendoza Province.

Sport

The city of Godoy Cruz is home to Godoy Cruz Antonio Tomba, a football club, which became in 2006 the first club from Mendoza Province ever to compete in the Primera Division. Other significant sport clubs are Andes Talleres, noteworthy in artistic roller skating, and YPF.

Districts

Godoy Cruz is divided in five districts:

Gobernador Benegas 
Godoy Cruz
Las Tortugas
Presidente Sarmiento
San Francisco del Monte

External links
Information about Godoy Cruz (Spanish)
History of Godoy Cruz (Spanish)
Godoy Cruz Antonio Tomba (Spanish)
Andes Talleres sport club (Spanish)
Swimming in YPF sport club (Spanish)
Maps of the Godoy Cruz Department

1855 establishments in Argentina
Departments of Mendoza Province